Mark Anthony Lillis (born 17 January 1960) is an English former professional football player and manager. He is assistant manager of League Two club  Scunthorpe United.

Playing career
Lillis was born in Manchester. He started his professional career at Huddersfield Town in Summer 1978. He played for Huddersfield for seven seasons before being sold in 1985 to Manchester City for £130,000. He stayed at this club for just one season, in which he finished Manchester city's top scorer with 12 goals and in August 1986 was sold to Derby County for £200,000. Because of knee problems, he did not play very often for Derby, and in September 1987 he went to Aston Villa. After that he played for Stockport County and Scunthorpe United before his playing career finished at Macclesfield Town in the mid 90s.

Managerial and coaching career
Lillis took his first job as coach for Macclesfield Town. Later, he worked for Huddersfield Town before he became assistant manager of Scunthorpe United in 1996. His first job as manager came in 1999, when he took the job at Halifax Town, a job he had until September 2000. In 2002, after John Gregory had employed him as a coach at Derby County, and Gregory was suspended from the job, Lillis was for a short time in March 2003 caretaker manager of Derby.

In March 2003 he also became assistant manager to Sammy McIlroy who was manager of Northern Ireland, and held the part-time job until October 2003. After that he became assistant manager to Sammy McIlroy at Stockport County, and when McIlroy quit the job in November 2004, Lillis became caretaker manager of the club until the 18 December 2004 when Chris Turner took over as the new manager.

On 30 May 2006, Lillis once again took over as assistant manager to Sammy McIlroy at Morecambe. Both Lillis and McIlroy left the club by mutual consent on 9 May 2011, after a disappointing twentieth-place finish in Football League Two.

In December 2011, he returned to his first club, Huddersfield Town, to become their new Academy Manager. Two months later he was appointed caretaker manager after the sacking of Lee Clark. He remained in this role until the appointment of Simon Grayson as the new manager, but was never needed as Town had no matches in the intermittent period.

Following Grayson's sacking on 24 January 2013, he became caretaker manager again, this time taking charge of 5 match, beginning and ending with Town's FA Cup 4th round tie against Leicester City. His 5 games in charge saw Town draw with Leicester in the cup, get a 1–0 win over Crystal Palace, before losing 3–0 to Lillis' former club, Derby County, then holding the runaway leaders Cardiff City to a goalless draw, then getting a 2–1 win against Leicester in the cup replay at the King Power Stadium, setting up a 5th round tie with Premier League side Wigan Athletic.

Following the departure of Mark Robins after a 4–0 defeat by AFC Bournemouth, Lillis was once again made caretaker manager on 11 August 2014.

Following the sacking of Chris Powell on 4 November 2015 he had his fourth stint as the caretaker manager, this though would only consist of the Yorkshire derby against Leeds United which they lost 3–0.

As of August 2017 he is the assistant manager to John Gregory at Indian Super League side Chennaiyin FC.

On 17 August 2020, Lillis rejoined  Scunthorpe United, returning as assistant manager to Neil Cox.

Personal life
His son, Josh Lillis, plays for Barrow as a goalkeeper.

Career statistics

Managerial statistics

Sources
 Mortimer, Gerald (2004): The Who's Who of DERBY COUNTY.  Breedon Books Publishing, Derby.

References

External links
Manager profile at Soccerbase

1960 births
Living people
Footballers from Manchester
English footballers
Association football forwards
English Football League players
Huddersfield Town A.F.C. players
Manchester City F.C. players
Derby County F.C. players
Aston Villa F.C. players
Scunthorpe United F.C. players
Stockport County F.C. players
English football managers
Halifax Town A.F.C. managers
Derby County F.C. managers
Stockport County F.C. managers
Huddersfield Town A.F.C. managers
Witton Albion F.C. players
National League (English football) players
Stockport County F.C. non-playing staff
Huddersfield Town A.F.C. non-playing staff
Morecambe F.C. non-playing staff 
Scunthorpe United F.C. non-playing staff 
Macclesfield Town F.C. players